Maria Lindblad Christensen (born 3 July 1995) is a Danish footballer who plays as a goalkeeper for FC Nordsjælland in the Elitedivisionen.

Club career
Christensen began her career at the age of four in the Houlkær boys' team. In 2005, she joined the female side of Team Viborg. At the age of 16, Christensen moved to Viborg's first team playing the 3F League. In the summer of 2012, she signed to play for Fortuna Hjørring in the Elitedivisionen. Christensen debuted on 23 September 2012 in a match against Taastrup FC. She was 16 when she debuted in the UEFA Women's Champions League, replacing Heidi Johansen who was suddenly injured.

International career
Since 2010, Christensen has played for several Danish national youth teams. On 22 October 2016, she debuted for Danish Senior team in a match against Iceland. Christensen was also part of the team which represented Denmark at the UEFA Women's Euro 2017, where they reached the competition final for the first time in history, but eventually lost to the Netherlands.

References

External links
 Player's Profile at Danish Football Association (DBU)
 

1995 births
Living people
Fortuna Hjørring players
Denmark women's international footballers
Danish women's footballers
Women's association football goalkeepers
FC Nordsjælland (women) players
People from Viborg Municipality
Sportspeople from the Central Denmark Region
UEFA Women's Euro 2017 players